Catrin Thomas (born 5 October 1964) from Caernarfon, Wales, is a British ski mountaineer and mountain climber.

At the 2011 World Championship of Ski Mountaineering, she participated amongst others in the women's relay team (together with the two Japanese Horibe Michiko and Mase Chigaya), which finished tenth.

Thomas was awarded the Polar Medal in 2019 in recognition of her 17 summers in Antarctica.

External links 
 Catrin Thomas, skimountaineering.org

References 

1964 births
Living people
British female ski mountaineers
Welsh mountain climbers
Welsh female skiers
People from Caernarfon
Sportspeople from Gwynedd
Female recipients of the Polar Medal
Female climbers
Recipients of the Polar Medal